Niphargellus glenniei, also known as the south-western groundwater shrimp, is a species of amphipod from within the family Niphargidae.

A native of the United Kingdom, it has been placed onto the UK Biodiversity Action Plan list of priority species. It is the first aquatic troglobite to be given a conservation status within the UK.

Description 
Niphargellus glenniei lacks pigment and is eyeless, much like other Stygofauna.

It will reach sexual maturity at around 2.5-3 mm long.

Distribution 
Niphargellus glenniei is endemic to England, where it has been recorded in 143 sites within the southwest of the country. It is restricted to the counties of Cornwall and Dorset.

Habitat 
Niphargellus glenniei lives in freshwater habitats such as caves, aquifers, wells, springs, quarries and mines.

References 

Niphargidae
Crustaceans described in 1952
Endemic fauna of England